Shinjū (1994) is the title of the debut novel by American writer Laura Joh Rowland, a historical mystery set in 1689 Genroku-era Japan. It is the first in Rowland's Sano Ichirō  series. The plot follow Sano, a yoriki (a lower-ranking police officer) as he investigates a double murder disguised as a lovers' suicide, and in the process, uncovers a plot to assassinate Shōgun Tokugawa Tsunayoshi.

References

Historical mystery novels
1994 novels
Fiction set in 1689
Novels set in Japan
Novels set in the 17th century
1994 debut novels
Japan in non-Japanese culture